Neurogenin-2 is a protein that in humans is encoded by the NEUROG2 gene.

Neurogenin-2 is a member of the neurogenin subfamily of basic helix-loop-helix (bHLH) transcription factor genes that play an important role in neurogenesis.

It has been found to reprogram astrocytes to glutamergic neurons when expressed.

References

Further reading

Human proteins